It's Not My Fault and I Don't Care Anyway is a 2017 Canadian comedy-drama film written and directed by Chris Craddock and starring Alan Thicke, Quinton Aaron, Leah Doz and Jesse Lipscombe. The film is based on Craddock's one-man play, Public Speaking.

Thicke stars as Patrick Spencer, a self-help guru and public speaker whose philosophy of extreme selfishness is encapsulated by the mantra "It's not my fault and I don't care anyway". However, his attitude toward life is put to the test when his daughter Diana (Doz) is kidnapped and held for ransom by drug dealer Johnny Three Fingers (Jesse Lipscombe).
 
The film marked the penultimate film role of Alan Thicke, who died December 13, 2016. He received a posthumous Canadian Screen Award nomination for Best Lead Actor in a TV Drama Program or Limited Series at the 6th Canadian Screen Awards.  Jesse Lipscombe won a Rosie Award for Best Performance by an Alberta Actor for his work in the film.

The film premiered at the Whistler Film Festival in 2016 before being distributed primarily through online streaming.

Cast
Alan Thicke as Patrick Spencer
Quinton Aaron as Brian Calhoun
Leah Doz as Diana Spencer
Jesse Lipscombe as Johnny Three-Fingers
Valerie Planche as Elizabeth Stone
Reamonn Joshee as Smitty
Kevin Hanchard as Edward

References

External links
 

2017 films
2017 comedy-drama films
Canadian comedy-drama films
English-language Canadian films
Films based on Canadian plays
Films shot in Alberta
2010s English-language films
2010s Canadian films